David Cousins is an RAF Commander.

David Cousins may also refer to:

Dave Cousins (born 1945), member of the Strawbs
Dave Cousins (archer) (born 1977), American compound archer